Palladium is a shopping mall located in the centre of Prague in the Czech Republic. It opened in 2007. There is also designated office space in the building totalling . It is one of the biggest shopping centres in the Czech Republic. It is directly opposite another shopping centre, Kotva Department Store.

History
The site where Palladium stands was under control of the Army until being sold in the 1990s. Construction on Palladium was announced in June 2005, with a projected completion date of autumn 2007. The new design has retained the facade of the previous Josef Barracks building. During the construction process, a number of medieval ruins were found underneath the construction site in an archeological excavation. The remains were removed but not before they were recorded and photographed.

The mall was opened by television personality Leoš Mareš in October 2007, becoming one of the biggest shopping centres in the Czech Republic. The mall closed for three days in February 2008 following a fire. Another fire, in August 2011, caused the evacuation of two floors of the mall, but it was smaller than the 2008 fire. Palladium was the only shopping mall in Prague to be open on Christmas Day 2007, and New Year's Day 2008.

Palladium Praha, the company which operates the centre, announced losses of over 700 million CZK in 2008. The following year, losses were over 2 billion CZK. In 2010 however, the company recorded a profit of 155 million CZK.

Tenants
Palladium contains 200 tenants, including 170 shops and 30 restaurants. Tenants at Palladium include Marks & Spencer, H&M, Albert, Esprit, Marc O'Polo, Starbucks, Pizza Hut and Topshop.

Transport
Palladium houses parking for 900 vehicles. The building is directly connected to the western exit of the Náměstí Republiky metro station on Prague Metro's Line B. The mall is also served by the tram stop Náměstí Republiky for overground public transport.

See also

List of shopping malls in the Czech Republic

References

External links

Official website

Shopping malls in Prague
Tourist attractions in Prague
New Town, Prague
Commercial buildings completed in 2007
2007 establishments in the Czech Republic
Shopping malls established in 2007
21st-century architecture in the Czech Republic